Schutzhaftlagerführer (head of the "preventive detention camp") was a paramilitary title of the SS, specific to the concentration and extermination camps Totenkopfverbande ("Death's-Head units"). A Schutzhaftlagerführer was in charge of the economic function of the camp. Usually, there was more than one SS man performing that function at each location due to their enormous size. Schutzhaftlagerführers received orders from the central offices in Berlin, such as DEST run directly by the SS. Prisoners' lives were entirely in their hands. Their orders, which usually involved routine maltreatment of condemned victims, were carried out through "assignments" so they would not have to deal with the dead resulting from them.

The Schutzhaftlagerführer and his adjutant were responsible for the operation of the camp. The Schutzhaftlagerführer had to maintain order, take care of daily routines, roll calls and so on. Under him were the Rapportführer, the Arbeitseinsatzführer and the Oberaufseherin (if there was a women's camp). They were directly responsible for order in the camp and they assigned prisoners to the outside work details. The Blockführer, each of whom was responsible for one or more barracks, were subordinate to them.

{|  class="wikitable sortable" style="text-align: center"
|+ Notable people
!Name
!Highest SS rank attained
!US/UK equivalent rank
!Concentration camp
|-
|
|SS-Sturmbannführer
|Major
|Auschwitz I
|-
|
|SS-Hauptsturmführer|Captain
|Mauthausen
|-
|
|SS-Oberführer|Senior colonel
|Dachau
|-
|
|SS-Obersturmführer|
|Natzweiler-Struthof, Bergen-Belsen
|-
|
|SS-Hauptsturmführer|Captain
|Auschwitz, Flossenbürg
|-
|
|SS-Untersturmführer|Second lieutenant
|Ahlem
|-
|
|SS-Obersturmführer|First lieutenant
|Auschwitz, Mittelbau-Dora, Bergen-Belsen
|-
|
|SS-Standartenführer|Colonel
|Lichtenburg
|-
|
|SS-Hauptsturmführer|Captain
|Natzweiler-Struthof
|-
|
|SS-Obersturmführer|First lieutenant
|Auschwitz
|-
|
|SS-Sturmbannführer|Major
|Dachau
|-
|
|
|
|Dachau, Majdanek
|-
|
|
|
|Sachsenhausen
|-
|
|SS-Hauptsturmführer|Captain
|Neuengamme
|-
|
|SS-Hauptscharführer|
|Natzweiler-Struthof
|-
|
|SS-Standartenführer|Colonel
|Dachau
|-
|
|SS-Obersturmführer|First lieutenant
|Gross-Rosen, Majdanek, Neuengamme
|-
|
|SS-Sturmbannführer|Major
|Dachau, Sachsenhausen, Buchenwald
|-
|
|SS-Sturmbannführer|Major
|Lichtenburg, Dachau, Buchenwald
|}

See also
Concentration Camps Inspectorate

References

Zentner, Christian & Bedürftig, Friedemann, The Encyclopedia of the Third Reich, (Macmillan), New York (1991)

Additional sources
 :de:Karin Orth: Die Konzentrationslager-SS. dtv, München 2004, .
 Wolfgang Kirsten: Das Konzentrationslager als Institution totalen Terrors. Centaurus, Pfaffenweiler 1992, .
 Hermann Langbein: Menschen in Auschwitz. Frankfurt am Main, Berlin Wien, Ullstein-Verlag, 1980, .
 Eugen Kogon: :de:Der SS-Staat. Das System der deutschen Konzentrationslager'', Alber, München 1946: Heyne, München 1995, 

 
Nazi paramilitary ranks
Nazi concentration camp occupations